The Baltimore Ravens joined the National Football League (NFL) in 1996 as an expansion team, after former-Cleveland Browns owner Art Modell decided to relocate his team to Baltimore. The Browns were later reactivated in 1999. The Ravens' first selection as an NFL team was Jonathan Ogden, an offensive lineman from UCLA. The team's most recent first-round selections were Kyle Hamilton, a safety from Notre Dame and the Tyler Linderbaum, a center from Iowa.

Every year during April, each NFL franchise seeks to add new players to its roster through a collegiate draft known as "the NFL Annual Player Selection Meeting", which is more commonly known as the NFL Draft. Teams are ranked in inverse order based on the previous season's record, with the worst record picking first, and the second worst picking second and so on. The two exceptions to this order are made for teams that appeared in the previous Super Bowl; the Super Bowl champion always picks 32nd, and the Super Bowl loser always picks 31st. Teams have the option of trading away their picks to other teams for different picks, players, cash, or a combination thereof. Thus, it is not uncommon for a team's actual draft pick to differ from their assigned draft pick, or for a team to have extra or no draft picks in any round due to these trades.

The Ravens have never selected the number one overall pick in the draft, but they have selected the fourth overall pick twice.

Key

Player selections

Footnotes

References 

 
 
 
 
 

Baltimore Ravens

first-round draft picks